Radosław Chruściński (born 14 December 1991 in Katowice, Poland) is a Polish pair skater. With partner Magdalena Klatka, he is a two-time (2011–2012) Polish national champion. His brother, Mateusz Chruściński, was also a pair skater.

Programs 
(with Klatka)

Competitive highlights 
(with Klatka)

References

External links 

 

Polish male pair skaters
1991 births
Living people
Sportspeople from Katowice